This list is a part of the international List of Gothic brick buildings.
For the parts of this list on the various countries see:

– In long tables, vertical arrows link to the navigation boards above (after the preceding table) and below (before the next table). –

Province of Groningen 
Background informations:
 RCE = Rijksdienst voor het Cultureel Erfgoed (National Service of Cultural Heritage)
 M-GR = Volume on Groningen Province of Monumenten in Nederland series, graduate download as PDF see Bibliography: Monumenten in Nederland

Friesland 

Background informations:
 RCE = Rijksdienst voor het Cultureel Erfgoed (National Service of Cultural Heritage)
 M-FR = Volume on the province of Friesland of Monumenten in Nederland series, graduate download as PDF see Bibliography: Monumenten in Nederland

North Holland 

Background informations:
 RCE = Rijksdienst voor het Cultureel Erfgoed (National Service of Cultural Heritage)
 M-NH = Volume on North Holland of Monumenten in Nederland series, graduate download as PDF see Bibliography: Monumenten in Nederland

South Holland 

Background informations:
 RCE = Rijksdienst voor het Cultureel Erfgoed (National Service for the Cultural Heritage)
 M-ZH = Volume on Zuid-Holland (South Holland) of Monumenten in Nederland series, graduate download as PDF see Bibliography: Monumenten in Nederland

Zeeland 

Background informations:
 RCE = Rijksdienst voor het Cultureel Erfgoed (National Service for the Cultural Heritage)
 M-ZE = Volume on Zeeland of Monumenten in Nederland series, graduate download as PDF see Bibliography: Monumenten in Nederland

North Brabant 

Background informations:
 RCE = Rijksdienst voor het Cultureel Erfgoed (National Service of Cultural Heritage)
 M-NB = Volume on North Brabant of Monumenten in Nederland series, graduate download as PDF see Bibliography: Monumenten in Nederland

Province of Utrecht 

Background informations:
 RCE = Rijksdienst voor het Cultureel Erfgoed (National Service of Cultural Heritage)
 M-UT = Volume on the province of Utrecht of Monumenten in Nederland series, graduate download as PDF see Bibliography: Monumenten in Nederland

Gelderland 

Background informations:
 RCE = Rijksdienst voor het Cultureel Erfgoed (National Service of Cultural Heritage)
 M-GE = Volume on Gelderland of Monumenten in Nederland series, graduate download as PDF see Bibliography: Monumenten in Nederland

Overijssel 

Background informations:
 RCE = Rijksdienst voor het Cultureel Erfgoed (National Service of Cultural Heritage)
 M-OV = Volume on Overijssel of Monumenten in Nederland series, graduate download as PDF see Bibliography: Monumenten in Nederland

Drenthe 

Background informations:
 RCE = Rijksdienst voor het Cultureel Erfgoed (National Service of Cultural Heritage)
 M-DR = Volume on Drenthe of Monumenten in Nederland series, graduate download as PDF see Bibliography: Monumenten in Nederland

Province of Limburg 

Background informations:
 RCE = Rijksdienst voor het Cultureel Erfgoed (National Service of Cultural Heritage)
 M-LI = Volume on the province of Limburg of Monumenten in Nederland series, graduate download as PDF see Bibliography: Monumenten in Nederland

Bibliography 
 Ronald Stenvert, Chris Kolman, Ben Olde Meierink, Margreet Tholens ...: Monumenten in Nederland, 12 volumes (1996–2006), available as PDF from http://www.dbnl.org/tekst/sten009monu00_01/

References 

Brick Gothic
Gothic Brick Buildings